Paul Jensen may refer to:

 Paul Jensen (Home and Away)
 Paul Jensen (ice hockey) (born 1955), American ice hockey player
 Paul Hilmar Jensen (1930–2004), Norwegian philatelist

See also
 Poul Jensen (disambiguation)